The geology of the United Arab Emirates includes very thick Paleozoic, Mesozoic and Cenozoic marine and continental sedimentary rocks overlying deeply buried Precambrian. The region has extensive oil and gas resources and was deformed during the last several million years by more distant tectonic events.

Geologic history, stratigraphy and tectonics
Atop the crystalline and igneous metamorphic basement rock of the Arabian Shield, Huqf Group clastics, carbonates and evaporites are the oldest sedimentary rocks in the UAE. Throughout the Paleozoic, the region experienced mainly clastic deposition. Carbonates are rare, except from the Cambrian, early-middle Devonian and early-middle Carboniferous. Jebel Dhanna in Abu Dhabi and the offshore islands of Dalma, Arzana, Zirkouh and Das have some of the oldest surface exposures: dolomite, shale and volcanic rocks brought to the surface by salt tectonics. The Hercynian orogeny affected the Middle East Craton in the Late Carboniferous, driving erosion and warping. Clastics deposited on the unconformity left by the erosion through the Permian, principally sandstone, siltstone, anhydrite and dolomite.

Mesozoic (251-66 million years ago)
With the formation of the supercontinent Pangea, the area became more arid in the Permian into the Triassic. With the westward uplifting of the region, it was succeeded by the Sudair Formation (dolomite, argillaceous limestone, shale and anhydrite) and the Gulailh and Jilh formations (offshore and on-shore in Abu Dhabi respectively). A full scale marine regression is recorded in the clastic lacustrine sandstones and limestones of the Minjur Formation. 

A very large carbonate platform took shape during a major marine transgression in the Jurassic, leaving behind the Hamlah Formation greywacke and mudstone from the early Jurassic, the middle Jurassic Araej Formation and the oolite dominated Asab Formation in the east. In the 1960s and 1970s, oil companies described the Thamama Group.

The early Cretaceous is marked by the fossil-bearing Shuaiba Formation, which contains breccia and mollusk-rich limestone as well as ammonite fossils. The Middle Cretaceous Wasia Group, including the Nahr Umr, Salbikh and Mishrif formations occurs between Abu Dhabi and Qatar and deposited during a time of moderate uplift and erosion. As a result, the Nahr Umr Formation contains glauconite sands, shale, small phosphates and some limestone. However, a marine transgression took place by the time of the Mauddud Member deposition. The packstone, greywacke and limestone contains abundant rudist fossils. The Aruma Group marks two successive transgression-regression events in the late Cretaceous, with the Laffan Formation argillaceous limestone and the Halul Formation calcareous shale and lime-mudstone from the first event and the marl-shale-mudstone Fiqa Formation and greywacke-dolomite Simsima Formation from the second event.

Cenozoic (66 million years ago-present)
A disconformity appeared with a drop in sea level in the Cenozoic. In the Paleogene, the Qatar Arch was comparatively stable and Abu Dhabi was at the edge of the Rub al Khali and Pabdeh-Gurpi (centered in the North Emirates) basins. The Hasa Group includes Umm Er Radhuma, Rus and Dammam formations. The Pabdeh Formation is largely offshore and contains  of shale and argillaceous limestone. 

The Umm Er Radhuma Formation ranges from 1150 feet in the northwest to 2300 in the east with limestone, dolomite, argillite, sabkha cycles, shale and anhydrite. Evaporite formed in the early Eocene leaving the 200 to 840 foot Rus Formation which also includes minor argillaceous limestones. A return to lower salinity and shallow marine conditions in the Middle Eocene deposited the nummulitic carbonates of the Dammam Formation, as well as dolomite and subordinate shales. Uplift and erosion affected the region into the Oligocene. The partially dolomite, and fossiliferous limestone dominated Asmari Formation emplaced in the far east, followed by the  Gachsaran Formation from the early Miocene, with anhydrite and dolomite, ascending to dolomite, limestone, anhydrite, shale, marl and other carbonates. The Gachsaran depocenter was located in onshore Abu Dhabi.
 
During the late Miocene and into the Pliocene, the Alpine Orogeny which uplifted the Alps and the Himalayas affected the region, uplifting the Omani and Zagros Mountains and driving significant erosion. Muds, sabkha deposits, windblown sand, conglomerate limestone, beach gravel and silt are all defining sediments of the past 2.5 million years of the Quaternary.

Hills and mountains

On the country's eastern border with Oman are the Western Hajar Mountains:

 Jabal ar Raḩraḩ (1,676 m) 
 Jabal Raḩabah (1.543 m) 
 Jabal Yibir (1,527 m) 
 Jabal Yabānah (1,472 m) 
 Jabal Qada‘ah (1,328 m) 
 Jabal Ḩafīt / Jebel Hafeet (1,249 m  
 Jabal al Fāyah - Jebel Faya (392 m)  
 Jebel Buhais (340 m)
 Jabal Yanas
 Jebel Al-Heben

 Shumayliyyah

See also
 List of United Arab Emirates-related topics
 Geography of the United Arab Emirates

References

External links
 List of mountains in the UAE
 Habitat: Mountains and Wadis
 Mountains of UAE (Dronestagram)
 Mountains in the UAE: A hotspot for adventure buffs (Bayut.com)
 United Arab Emirates - Highest Mountains (GeoNames)
 The Highest Mountains of the UAE (Dubai-Freexone.ae)